The 1939 Birmingham Aston by-election was a parliamentary by-election held on 17 May 1939 for the British House of Commons constituency of Birmingham Aston.

Background 
Arthur Hope, who served as Birmingham Aston's Member of Parliament since 1931, gave up his seat after being appointed Governor of Madras in 1939. He assumed office as governor in March 1940.

Previous result

Candidates 

 Edward Kellett - A lieutenant in the Sherwood Rangers Yeomanry.
 Samuel Segal - Physician and son of Moshe Zvi Segal.

Result

Aftermath 
Kellett sat until killed on active service in 1943. The Conservatives held the ensuing by-election.

References

 British Parliamentary Election Results 1918-1949, compiled and edited by F.W.S. Craig (The Macmillan Press 1979)

1939 elections in the United Kingdom
1939 in England
Aston, 1943
1930s in Birmingham, West Midlands